Aleksandr Sergeyevich Golovin (born 30 May 1996) is a Russian professional footballer who plays as an attacking midfielder for Ligue 1 club Monaco and the Russia national team. He can also play as a central midfielder or a winger.

Early life
Golovin was born to a mining family in the small mining town of Kaltan in Southern Siberia, Russia. Since childhood, he was friends with Aleksandr Plyasunov, a coach at the local youth sports school. When Golovin was six years old, he started playing football under Plyasunov, before moving on to the school of FC Novokuznetsk (then called Metallurg-Zapsib) and the Olympic reserve school in Leninsk-Kuznetsky. After playing for Metallurg, he was invited to play for the squad of the Siberian team. It was during this time that Golovin attracted the attention of scouts and was invited to play for PFC CSKA Moscow.

Club career

CSKA Moscow
Golovin debuted playing for PFC CSKA Moscow on 24 September 2014 against FC Khimik Dzerzhinsk in the 1/16 round of the Russian Cup. He made the starting lineup and was subbed out in the 88th minute of the game.

Golovin made his Russian Football Premier League debut for PFC CSKA Moscow on 14 March 2015 in a game against FC Mordovia Saransk as a sub in the 72nd minute of the game. He made his UEFA Champions League debut against Sparta Prague on 5 August 2015, subbing in for Alan Dzagoev. He scored his first goal for CSKA on 9 April 2016 against FC Mordovia Saransk.

In the summer of 2017, Arsenal offered between £8 and £10 million for Golovin, but CSKA declined the transfer.

On 2 December 2016, Golovin extended his contract with CSKA Moscow until the end of the 2020–21 season.

AS Monaco
On 27 July 2018, Golovin signed a five-year contract with AS Monaco for an undisclosed, but record-transfer fee, from CSKA Moscow. Golovin made his competitive debut for Monaco in a 1–1 Ligue 1 home draw against Nîmes on 21 September 2018, coming on as a substitute during the 72nd minute. He made his first start in Ligue 1 on 25 September, in a 0–1 home defeat against Angers. He scored his first Ligue 1 goal on 2 February 2019, in a 2–1 home win over Toulouse.

On 24 September 2019, Golovin scored two goals and provided an assist for Wissam Ben Yedder in Monaco's 3–1 Ligue 1 home win over Nice. On 6 January 2021, in an away match against Lorient and with the score at 1–1, Golovin, who had just recovered from an injury, was brought on as a substitute and scored after less than a minute. Two weeks later, as a substitute once again, he delivered two assists, each from a corner kick, to help his team come from behind and defeat Marseille.

On 7 February 2021, Golovin scored his first hat-trick for Monaco in a 4–3 away victory against Nîmes. In doing so, he became the first player from Russia to record a hat-trick in Ligue 1.

On 28 December 2022, Golovin gave an assist in a 3-2 away victory against Auxerre. On 11 February 2023, he scored the first goal in a 3–1 home win against Paris Saint-Germain, his fifth goal of the season so far. On 19 February 2023, he scored his sixth goal of the season against Stade Brestois.

International career

Golovin won the 2013 UEFA European Under-17 Championship with Russia national under-17 team, with which he also participated in the 2013 FIFA U-17 World Cup. Later, Golovin went on to represent the Russia national under-19 team at the 2015 UEFA European Under-19 Championship, where Russia came in second place. Golovin made his debut for the Russia national team on 7 June 2015 in a friendly game against Belarus at the Arena Khimki, replacing captain Roman Shirokov in the 61st minute and scoring Russia's second goal of a 4–2 victory 16 minutes later.

On 11 May 2018, he was included in Russia's extended 2018 FIFA World Cup squad. On 3 June 2018, he was included in the finalized World Cup squad. On 14 June 2018, he played a crucial role in Russia's 5–0 victory over Saudi Arabia making two assists and scoring the final goal, a free-kick in the opening match of the 2018 World Cup.

On 11 May 2021, he was included in the preliminary extended 30-man squad for UEFA Euro 2020. On 2 June 2021, he was included in the final squad. He played every minute in all 3 of Russia's group stage games as Russia was eliminated after losing to Belgium and Denmark and beating Finland.

Career statistics

Club

International

International goals
Scores and results list Russia's goal tally first.

Honours

Club
CSKA Moscow
Russian Premier League: 2015–16

International
Russia U-17
UEFA European Under-17 Championship: 2013

Russia U-19
UEFA European Under-19 Championship runner-up: 2015

References

External links

Player profile at CSKA Moscow official website

AS Monaco player profile

1996 births
People from Kaltan
Living people
Russian footballers
Russia youth international footballers
Russia under-21 international footballers
Russia international footballers
Association football midfielders
Russian Premier League players
Ligue 1 players
PFC CSKA Moscow players
AS Monaco FC players
UEFA Euro 2016 players
2017 FIFA Confederations Cup players
2018 FIFA World Cup players
UEFA Euro 2020 players
Russian expatriate footballers
Expatriate footballers in Monaco
Russian expatriate sportspeople in Monaco
Sportspeople from Kemerovo Oblast